Nikolai Nikolayevich Kryukov (2 February 1908 – 5 April 1961) was a Russian composer active in the Soviet era.

Kryukov was prominent in the Soviet film industry, with more than 40 film score credits for films released between 1949 and 1962. His name is attached to the score provided for a 1950 release of Eisenstein's film The Battleship Potemkin (1925).

References

External links

Russian film score composers
Male film score composers
1908 births
1961 deaths
20th-century composers
20th-century Russian male musicians
1961 suicides
Suicides in the Soviet Union